Mercure is a French midscale hotel brand specialized in traditional hotels managed by committed hoteliers, and owned by Accor. Created in 1973 in France, the brand was acquired by Accor in 1975. The Mercure brand appears on 899 hotels in 61 countries (2021).

Grand Mercure is the international premium brand of Mercure.

History

1973–2007: Growth 

The first Mercure hotel was established in 1973 in Saint-Witz, France. In 1975, Mercure was acquired by the group Accor (then Novotel-SIEH) and became Novotel's complementary midscale brand in the group's strategy.

In 1983, Mercure launched the  where 80% of the wines were selected by Mercure's oenologists, and 20% were selected by the hoteliers.

In 1989, Mercure opened its 100th hotel. In 1991, following Accor's acquisition of the Compagnie Internationale des Wagons-Lits, the Altea hotels acquired through this deal became Mercure hotels. Many hotel brands purchased by Accor throughout the 1990s (Parthénon, Libertel, Jardins de Paris, Frantour, All Seasons) were turned into Mercure hotels. By 2001, 655 Mercure hotels were in operation worldwide.

Since 2007: Global refurbishment 

In 2007, following the launch of Accor's new brands MGallery, Pullman and All Seasons, the group allocated several of its Mercure-branded locations to the development of those new brands.

In 2010, Mercure launched a global refurbishment program. The rooms were modernized, and the cost of renovation was minimized thanks to new industrial methods (modules). A design catalogue enabled hoteliers to choose from a variety of style options. The  became Cave & Saveurs. Breakfast became gluten-free with local products only.

In 2011, Accor signed a deal with Jupiter Hotels in the UK to turn 24 hotels into Mercure hotels. In 2012, Mercure opened in China the first Grand Mercure branded Mei Jue for the Chinese market. In 2015, Mercure launched in Colombia and opened 3 Grand Mercure in Brazil.

Description 

Mercure is a midscale hotel brand specialized in traditional hotels managed by committed hoteliers and owned by Accor. Locally influenced, most Mercure properties provide midscale full service hotel services.

Grand Mercure is the international premium brand of Mercure. 

The Mercure brand applies to 875 hotels in 63 countries (2019).

Development

See also
 Accor
 Novotel

References

External links

Accor
French brands
Hotels established in 1973